The National Human Rights Commission of India (abbreviated as NHRC) is a statutory public body constituted on 12 October 1993 under the Protection of Human Rights Ordinance of 28 September 1993. It was given a statutory basis by the Protection of Human Rights Act, 1993 (PHRA). The NHRC is responsible for the protection and promotion of human rights, defined by the act as "Rights Relating To Life, liberty, equality and dignity of the individual guaranteed by the constitution or embodied in the international covenants and enforceable by courts in India".

Functions of NHRC 
The Protection of Human Rights Act mandates the NHRC to perform the following:

 Proactively or reactively inquire into violations of human rights by government of India or negligence of such violation by a public servant
  The protection of human rights and recommend measures for their effective implementation
 Review the factors, including acts of terrorism that inhibit the enjoyment of human rights and recommend appropriate remedial measures
 To study treaties and other international instruments on human rights and make recommendations for their effective implementation
 Undertake and promote research in the field of human rights
 To visit jails and study the condition of inmates
 Engage in human rights education among various sections of society and promote awareness of the safeguards available for the protection of these rights through publications, the media, seminars and other available means
 Encourage the efforts of NGOs and institutions that works in the field of human rights voluntarily.
 Considering the necessity for the protection of human rights.
 Requisitioning any public record or copy thereof from any court or office.

Composition
The NHRC consists of:
The chairperson and five members (excluding the ex-officio members) 
 A Chairperson, who has been a Chief Justice of India or a Judge of the Supreme Court.

 One member who is, or has been, a Judge of the Supreme Court of India and one member who is, or has been, the Chief Justice of a High Court.
 Three Members, out of which at least one shall be a woman to be appointed from amongst persons having knowledge of, or practical experience in, matters relating to human rights.
 In addition, the Chairpersons of National Commissions viz., National Commission for Scheduled Castes, National Commission for Scheduled Tribes, National Commission for Women , National Commission for Minorities, National Commission for Backward Classes, National Commission for Protection of Child Rights; and the Chief Commissioner for Persons with Disabilities serve as ex officio members.

The sitting Judge of the Supreme Court or sitting Chief Justice of any High Court can be appointed only after the consultation with the Chief Justice of India.

Chairman and members
Arun Kumar Mishra, a former Judge of Supreme Court is current chairperson of the commission (11th chairperson of NHRC). The last chairman of the NHRC was Justice H. L. Dattu, who completed his tenure on 2 December 2020. The other members are:
 Mr. Justice M.M. Kumar
 Dr. D.M. Mulay
 Mr. Rajiv Jain

Ex-officio members:
 Chairperson, National Commission for Scheduled Castes 
 Chairperson, National Commission for Scheduled Tribes
 Sardar Iqbal Singh Lalpura, Chairperson, National Commission for Minorities
 Rekha Sharma, Chairperson, National Commission for Women 
 Chairperson, National Commission for Backward Classes
 Chairperson National Commission for Protection of Child Rights
 Chief Commissioner for Persons with Disabilities

State Human Rights Commission
A state government may constitute a body known as the Human Rights Commission of that State to exercise the powers conferred upon, and to perform the functions assigned to, a State Commission. In accordance with the amendment brought in TPHRA,1993 point No.10 below is the list of State Human Rights Commissions formed to perform the functions of the commission as stated under chapter V of TPHRA,1993 (with amendment act 2006). At present, 25 states have constituted SHRC

Appointment
Section 2, 3 and 4 of TPHRA lay down the rules for appointment to the NHRC. The Chairperson and members of the NHRC are appointed by the President of India, on the recommendation of a committee consisting of:
 The Prime Minister (Chairperson)
 The Home Minister
 The Leader of the Opposition in the Lok Sabha (Lower House)
 The Leader of the Opposition in the Rajya Sabha (Upper House)
 The Speaker of the Lok Sabha (Lower House)
 The Deputy Chairman of the Rajya Sabha (Upper House)

List of Chairpersons

Controversy 

A report concerning the manner in which the Shivani Bhatnagar murder case was rejected, a case involving high-ranking officials, opened the organisation up to questioning over the usefulness of human rights commissions set up by the government at the national and state levels.
In mid-2011, the chairman of the NHRC, ex-Chief Justice K.G. Balakrishnan came under a cloud for allegedly owning assets disproportionate to his income. His son-in-law P. V. Srinijan, an Indian National Congress politician, had to resign for suddenly coming into possession of land worth Rs. 25 lakhs. Many prominent jurists, including former CJ J. S. Verma, SC ex-Judge V. R. Krishna Iyer, noted jurist Fali S. Nariman, former NHRC member Sudarshan Agrawal and prominent activist lawyer Prashant Bhushan, have called on Balakrishnan's resignation pending from the HRC pending inquiry. In February 2012, the Supreme Court inquired of the government regarding the status of the inquiry.

Human Rights Campaign's recommendations 
NHRC held that 16 out of 19 police encounters with suspected Maoists in Guntur and Kurnool districts of Andhra Pradesh, prior to 2002 were fake and recommended to Government payment of compensation of Rs 5 lakh each to the kin of the families.

References

External links
 National Human Rights Commission Official Website
 Judicial Economist

Human rights organisations based in India
National human rights institutions
Executive branch of the government of India
Indian commissions and inquiries
1993 establishments in Delhi
Organisations based in Delhi